Hussein Nagi Khairan is a Yemeni military officer. Until November 2016, he served as defense minister for the Houthi-appointed government of Yemen, having been appointed on 22 March 2015, after the defection of Mahmoud al-Subaihi to the internationally recognised government of Abd Rabbuh Mansur Hadi in Aden. According to a Houthi political official, Khairan's appointment placed him in direct command of all military units except for those loyal to Hadi. He reportedly took charge of the military offensive against Hadi's holdouts in southern Yemen.

Biography
Khairan previously served from 1993 to 2014 as commander of the 1st Marine Infantry Brigade in Socotra. In December 2014, Hadi named him as chief of staff of the Yemen Army. However, the Houthi militants that occupied Sana'a earlier that year blocked him from entering the defense ministry. Hadi officially fired Khairan as army chief of staff on 5 April, weeks after he switched sides to join the Houthis' ranks.

He was reported to have been killed on October 8, 2016, during the Sanaa Funeral Bombing.

His death was then denied.

On 28 November 2016, he was replaced by Mohamed al-Atifi as defense minister.

On 29 November 2016, he was appointed as presidential advisor.

References

Living people
Yemeni generals
Yemeni politicians
1952 births
People from Sanaa Governorate